Rugby League Review is a bi-monthly magazine owned by the Australian media company TL Sports Publications and is currently the only rugby league magazine being published in Australia. It was first published in October 2002 and features articles on all aspects of the game including the NRL, State Cups, Juniors, Women's Rugby League, International Rugby League and a look back at how the game used to be.

See also
Big League
Rugby League Week

References

External links

2002 establishments in Australia
Magazines established in 2002
Bi-monthly magazines published in Australia
Sports magazines published in Australia
Magazines published in Sydney
National Rugby League
Rugby football magazines
Rugby league in Australia
Rugby league mass media